Bufo cryptotympanicus is a species of toad in the family Bufonidae. Known commonly as the earless toad, it is found in southern China (Guangxi and Guangdong provinces) and northern Vietnam (on/near Mount Fansipan). Its natural habitats are subtropical or tropical moist lowland forests, rivers, swamps, freshwater marshes, and intermittent freshwater marshes. It is threatened by habitat loss.

References

cryptotympanicus
Amphibians of China
Amphibians of Vietnam
Near threatened animals
Amphibians described in 1962
Taxonomy articles created by Polbot